Aleksandar M. Marković (born 22 May 1981) is a politician in Serbia. He has served in the National Assembly of Serbia since 2014 as a member of the Serbian Progressive Party.

He is not to be confused with a different Aleksandar Marković who currently serves as assistant mayor of Belgrade.

Early life and career
Marković was born in Belgrade, in what was then the Socialist Republic of Serbia in the Socialist Federal Republic of Yugoslavia. He is a graduate economist.

Politician

Municipal politics
Marković entered political life as a member of the far-right Serbian Radical Party. He appeared in the third position on the party's electoral list for the Vračar municipal assembly in the 2004 Serbian local elections and was awarded a mandate after the list finished in third place with nine seats. (Between 2000 and 2001, mandates in Serbian elections were awarded at the discretion of successful parties and coalitions, and it was common practice for the mandates to be awarded out of numerical order. Marković did not automatically receive a mandate by virtue of his list position, but he was included in the Radical Party's delegation all the same.) The election was won by the Democratic Party and its allies, and Marković served in opposition. He given the fourth position on the party's list for Vračar in the 2008 local elections and was selected for a second term after the list won eleven seats. This election was again won by the Democrats and their allies.

Marković also received the forty-eighth position on the Radical Party's list for the City Assembly of Belgrade in 2008  and was awarded a mandate after the party won forty seats. The results of the election were initially inconclusive, but a new municipal administration was eventually formed by the Democratic Party, the Socialist Party of Serbia, and other parties, and the Radicals remained in opposition at the city level.

The Radical Party experienced a significant split later in 2008, with several members joining the more moderate Serbian Progressive Party under the leadership of Tomislav Nikolić and Aleksandar Vučić. Marković sided with the Progressives. On 11 February 2009, he stood down from the Belgrade city assembly.

Following a 2011 reform, mandates in Serbian elections were awarded to successful candidates in numerical order. Marković was given the fourth position on the Progressive Party's Let's Get Vračar Moving list in the 2012 local elections and was returned for a third term when the list won seven mandates, placing second against the Democrats. He did not seek re-election in 2016.

Parliamentarian
Marković received the 125th position on the Progressive Party's Aleksandar Vučić — Future We Believe In list in the 2014 parliamentary election and was elected when the list won a landslide victory with 158 mandates. In the parliament that followed, he served on the assembly committee on administrative, budgetary, mandate, and immunity issues. He was promoted to the nineteenth position on the successor Aleksandar Vučić – Serbia Is Winning list in the 2016 election and was re-elected when the list won 131 mandates.

During the 2016–20 parliament, Marković was a member of the defence and internal affairs committee, the committee on the diaspora and Serbs in the region, the committee on Kosovo-Metohija, and the committee on administrative, budgetary, mandate, and immunity issues; a deputy member of the security services control committee and the committee on constitutional and legislative issues; the head of Serbia's parliamentary friendship groups with Lesotho and Moldova; and a member of the parliamentary friendship groups with Azerbaijan, Belarus, Bosnia and Herzegovina, Chile, Croatia, Cuba, Djibouti, El Salvador, Ghana, Guatemala, Guyana, Indonesia, Iraq, Malawi, Micronesia, Montenegro, Myanmar, Nepal, North Korea, the State of Palestine, the Philippines, Russia, Syria, Tunisia, Uganda, the United Arab Emirates, Vietnam, Zambia, and Zimbabwe. He was also appointed as a substitute member of Serbia's delegation to the Parliamentary Assembly of the Council of Europe, where he caucused with the European People's Party. From 2016 to 2020, he was an alternate member of the committee on culture, science, education, and media.

He received the thirty-second position on the Progressive Party's list in the 2020 Serbian parliamentary election and was elected to a third term when the list won a landslide majority with 188 mandates. He is now the chair of the defence committee, a member of the security committee and the diaspora committee, the head of Serbia's parliamentary friendship group with North Macedonia, and a member of the friendship groups with Armenia, Bosnia and Herzegovina, Bulgaria, Hungary, Moldova, Montenegro, Romania, and the United Arab Emirates.

References

1981 births
Living people
Members of the City Assembly of Belgrade
Members of the National Assembly (Serbia)
Substitute Members of the Parliamentary Assembly of the Council of Europe
Serbian Radical Party politicians
Serbian Progressive Party politicians
European People's Party politicians